Bērzaine parish is an administrative unit of Valmiera Municipality in the Vidzeme region of Latvia. The administrative center is Bērzaine village.

Towns, villages and settlements of Bērzaine parish 
 Bērzaine
 Ludzēni
 Vākšēni

References 

Parishes of Latvia
Valmiera Municipality
Vidzeme